Mounir Bouziane (born 5 February 1991) is a French professional footballer who plays as a forward.

Career
Born in Saint-Louis, Haut-Rhin, Bouziane started his career with local club Saint-Louis Neuweg before joining the youth ranks of RC Strasbourg. In 2009, he made the switch to German football, joining SC Freiburg's reserve team in the Regionalliga. In 2013, Bouziane moved to Mainz 05 II, signing a one year contract with the club. On 26 July 2014, he made his 3. Liga debut for Mainz, scoring a goal against Arminia Bielefeld in the opening match of the season.

On 22 January 2017, he made his Bundesliga debut for Mainz 05 in a 0–0 draw against 1. FC Köln, when he came on as a substitute for Jairo Samperio in the 77th minute.

Career statistics

References

External links
 

1991 births
Living people
French sportspeople of Algerian descent
Sportspeople from Haut-Rhin
French footballers
Algerian footballers
Footballers from Alsace
Association football forwards
Bundesliga players
3. Liga players
Regionalliga players
SC Freiburg II players
1. FSV Mainz 05 II players
FC Energie Cottbus players
FC Energie Cottbus II players
1. FSV Mainz 05 players
FC Hansa Rostock players
SV Waldhof Mannheim players
Türkgücü München players
FC 08 Homburg players
French expatriate footballers
Algerian expatriate footballers
Algerian expatriate sportspeople in Germany
Expatriate footballers in Germany